Mitchell Charles Johnson (born October 2, 1969) better known by his stage name Paperboy, is an American rapper. He is best known for his single "Ditty" which charted at #10 on the Hot 100 in 1993.

Johnson was born in San Diego, California and later moved to Oakland.

Career
Paperboy's associated acts were R. Kelly, Eazy-E, and Rhythm D. His most acclaimed album was his 1992 debut, The Nine Yards, which was certified gold by the Recording Industry Association of America (RIAA).

The album featured 10 tracks with G-Funk influenced production from Rhythm D, who was known for producing for artists on Ruthless Records such as Eazy-E, B.G. Knocc Out, and Dresta. Its single "Ditty" is Paperboy's most successful single. Paperboy's second album, City to City, was released in 1996.

Discography

Studio albums
 The Nine Yards (1992)
 City to City (1996)
 The Love Never Dies (2004)

Singles

External links
 Paperboy at AllMusic

References

African-American rappers
1969 births
Living people
21st-century American rappers
21st-century African-American musicians
20th-century African-American people